Givet station (French: Gare de Givet) is a French railway station serving the town Givet, Ardennes department in northeastern France. It is the terminus of the Soissons–Givet railway. The station is served by regional trains towards Charleville-Mézières. The line towards Dinant in Belgium was closed for passenger traffic in 1988.

See also 

 List of SNCF stations in Grand Est

References

External links
 

Railway stations in Ardennes (department)